Kensei: Sacred Fist, known in Japan as , is a 1998 3D-based fighting game developed by Konami Computer Entertainment Tokyo and published by Konami.  It was first released  in Japan on November 19, 1998, in North America on November 30, 1998, and in Europe the same year. It was later re-released in 2001 under the reissue title Kensei: Sacred Fist Value Series. The game is a straight-to-console release, without an arcade counterpart.

Gameplay
Kensei uses a button distribution style, separating them into punch, kick, throw and guard. The system provides the player with a large array of moves and combos, and multi-step throws are available, though both normal and multi-throws can be countered by pressing a button that flashes on the screen. Game speed is rather slow (one of the reasons for it not to become an arcade game), and relies more on timing, strategy and accurate knowledge of attack ranges to land successful combo strings and juggles. Button-mashing is often a bad tactical choice, since the characters remain vulnerable for long times after performing an unsuccessful combo. Jumping is realistic, albeit for some extra height. Sidestepping is allowed but is a much slower move, aside from some characters who integrate special sidesteps in their movesets.

The guard button acts rather as a "dodge" button, as the characters' animation shows them avoiding the attacks rather than taking them on their guard. Characters may assume rapidly a counter-offensive position or be "bounced back" to dodge, and the recovery time relies on the player's ability to press the guard button with sufficient time. Low attacks must be guarded by pressing Down + Guard Button, while pressing Up + Guard Button may allow the character to sidestep at the end of a combo.

The Arcade game structure of Kensei comprises 10 stages, with the first eight being made up of random opponents. The specific playing character will encounter a sub-boss in the ninth stage while the tenth one will have them facing off against the crime lord Leimeng and the eleventh (and final) one will have the playing character battle against Leimeng's bodyguard Kaiya. Along with the classical Survival, Training, and Time Attack modes, a special mini-game can be activated once all characters have been unlocked: it's a "racing" mode where the player controls a character and makes it run through a circuit, using button mashing to gain speed.

Playable Characters
The game features 9 initial playable fighters from around the world with their own varied fighting styles and 14 hidden characters that can be unlocked through the completion of the game. Most of the unlockables share a moveset with one of the main characters, with slight modifications regarding the attacking range and combo length.

The following is a list of the 9 main characters, with their unlockable counterparts:

 Yugo Sangunji (Karate, Japan): Yugo was forced into fighting his brother Akira as a result of their parents' disagreement over training methodologies. Now, he finds himself leaving home and embarking on a journey in a bid to test his own strength. However, sometimes his departure, Yugo is unaware that his father was murdered by his past rival, who is now a boss of underworld organization. His surname is spelled 三軍司 ("Sanguuji") in Japanese version. Voiced by Masaaki Ōkura.
 Akira Sangunji (Karate, Japan): The older brother and sub-boss to Yugo Sangunji. While Akira cannot keep up at Yugo’s level, they hold a strong brotherhood. Sometimes after Yugo’s departure, their father was murdered by his past rival who is now a crime boss of an underworld organization, leading Akira to sought Yugo for an aid to find the culprit.
 Hong Yuli (Drunken Fist, China): Yuli became curious about the true art of Drunken Fist Fighting while training under a Drunken Kung-Fu master called Su Qingtao. She is determined to prove herself as a first-class Drunken Kung-Fu artist, and avenge her parents’ death at the hands of the crime boss. Voiced by Kumiko Watanabe.
 Su Qingtao (Drunken Fist, China): A master of Drunken Fist and sub-boss to Hong Yuli, as well as her father’s old friend. When the crime boss murdered Yuli’s parents, Qingtao rescued Yuli and raised her as his own granddaughter. Unfortunately, when his training proves Yuli may end up endangering herself, out of obsession to avenger her late parents, Qingtao must find her before she suffers a same fate as her parents.
 Douglas Anderson (Jeet Kune Do/Koppo, USA): Douglas has spent years trying to hunt down a global crime syndicate. After a major breakthrough in the case, his partner Jim was gunned down in cold blood. Douglas is looking for a little payback... (Note: Douglas' character design is strongly based on real-life actor and martial artist Steven Seagal.)
 Yoko Cindy Matsudaira (Koppo, USA): The former lover and sub-boss to Douglas Anderson. She and Douglas used to date each other before he found out she is an ally of a crime boss she work for. Voiced by Kimberly Forsythe.
 Allen (Muay Thai, raised in Asia): Parentless since infancy, and raised in an orphanage and by his abusive foster father, Allen's Muay Thai expertise was acquired to defend himself against a dangerous and pitiless world. He fights only for survival, one day at a time.
 Steve Laettner (Kickboxing, USA): The sub-boss to Allen. His childhood life is by far polar opposite to Allen. Although he lost his beloved mother to a lung cancer at age 3, just his father abandoned him at age 5, he is adopted by a kickboxing champion Justin Carter, whom Steve consider him as a father figure and an inspiration to become a champion. Although become bored by his undefeated championship streaks, Steves comes to reluctantly work as a bodyguard for a crime boss of a global syndicate, who offers him a chance to defeat Allen.
 Ann Griffith (Amateur wrestling, Great Britain): Ann loves amateur wrestling and plans to expand public interest in it by staging a street fight event, ever since being saved by Arthur Stewart from a couple of street bikers. Voiced by Sarah Selleri.
 Arthur Stewart (Amateur wrestling, Great Britain): A savior, and sub-boss to Ann Griffith. The current heir of weapon company Stewart Firearms Corps., Arthur’s father suddenly disappeared and gave him the rights to restore their company from its pitiful state. He soon learn from Ann that his family’s company is having a war with an global syndicate.
 Heinz Streit (Pit fighting, Germany): Heinz was born into a family of known aristocratic ancestry but quickly grew tired of his wealthy and pampered life. Now he spends his days picking and joining fights. He enjoys the status of being the black sheep of the family.
 Natsuki Kornelia (Pit fighting, Germany): The sub-boss to Heinz Streit, her savior. Similar to Heinz, she grew tired of her family’s peaceful, yet strictly pampered lifestyle to seek thrill and excitement. Feeling in debt to Heinz for saving her life from a group of street thugs, Kornelia became his companion, while also wishing to surpass his strength in pit fighting. Voiced by Kimberly Forsythe.
 Hyoma Tsukikage (Ninjutsu, Japan): Left as an infant at Oomiwa Temple, along with his older sister  Kazane, by their parents who subsequently disappeared. Hyoma has been training at the temple since that day. But one day, he comes across a clue to this parent's possible whereabouts and decides to search for them.
 Sessue Kanoh (Ninjutsu, Japan): The ninjutsu master who is a guardian to both Hyoma and Kazane Tsukikage. The sub-boss to Hyoma. Voiced by Koji Ishii.
 David Human (Professional wrestling, USA): A popular pro wrestler, David hears rumors that his friend and rival Mark has joined forces with a global underground organization, and decides to find out the truth.
 Mark Galeon (Professional wrestling, USA): The sub-boss to David Human. Following his final match with David, which ends with draw, Mark learns that he and his family are being targeted by an underground organization, after refusing their offer to join their side. While embarking a solo mission for his family’s safety and to get revenge on the syndicate, he is falsely rumored to work for them. Voiced by Eric Kelso
 Saya Tsubaki (Kenpo, Japan): Saya has a father who walked out five years ago, following her mother’s death at the same time of her birth, and a family who avoids answering her questions about him. Tired of the evasions, with her father’s sudden attack on her grandfather Genya was a last straw, she decides to search for him herself, despite her grandfather attempts to stop her and the attack was meant to lure her to him. Voiced by Yuriko Fuchizaki.
 Genya Tsubaki (Kenpo, Japan): The father of Kaiya Tsubaki and the grandfather to Saya. The sub-boss to Saya. Genya has since been regretful when Kaiya becomes a crime boss of a global underground empire, and protecting her from him. He is attacked by his own son, as a mean to lure Saya to come to him.

Other unlockable characters are:

 Zhou Leimeng ("Original Style", Hong Kong): The first boss of the game. A Hong Kong Chinese man dressed in a business suit who is a secretary of an evil crime corporation. He is far shorter than the other characters in the game, therefore moves that target at his head's height usually fail against him.
 Kaiya Tsubaki (Kenpo, Japan): The second and final boss of the game. The father of Saya and son of Genya, and originally implied in the manual as Zhou’s bodyguard. He was once the latter’s top students until his involvement with crime is exposed. Few years after marrying Saya’s mother, Kaiya renamed the evil organization he work for as Tsubaki Corporation, after he murdered his previous boss, in the same year his wife died giving a birth of Saya and Genya raised her to ensure she never suffer a same fate as Kaiya. When Saya grew up as a second year high schooler, Kaiya attacked his father to lure her into coming to him and persuade her to continue his criminal empire before retiring. He was also a rival of Yugo and Akira Sanguji’s father, whom he murdered sometimes after Yugo left to get revenge being defeated by him in the past.
 Jelly Thomas/Billy Thomas ("Original Style", USA): Two American criminal brothers who wear animal masks over their heads: Jelly (presumably "Jerry") wears a parrot mask while Billy wears a penguin mask. The two of them share the same character slot, much like Kuma/Panda in the Tekken series.
 Kazane Tsukikage (Ninjutsu, Japan): Kazane is the older sister of Hyoma. Her name was mistranslated as "Fuune" in the American manual, and entirely changed to "Kimiko" in the European manual. Voiced by Saeko Shimazu.

Reception

The game was largely not well received by critics. IGN and Gamespot were both quite critical of the game calling it mediocre. James Mielke wrote "Kensei: Sacred Fist is little more than a bland footnote in fighting game history."

References

External links
Kensei Sacred Fist at Mobygames

1998 video games
3D fighting games
Konami games
Multiplayer video games
PlayStation (console) games
PlayStation (console)-only games
Fighting games
Video games scored by Akira Yamaoka
Video games developed in Japan